PF-04479745 is a research ligand developed by Pfizer. It is related to lorcaserin, and acts as a potent and selective agonist for the 5-HT2C receptor, with lower affinity and antagonist action at the related 5-HT2A and 5-HT2B receptor subtypes.

References 

Serotonin receptor agonists